Andrea de Cesaris (31 May 19595 October 2014) was an Italian racing driver. He started 208 Formula One Grands Prix but never won. As a result, he holds the record for the most races started without a race victory. A string of accidents early in his career earned him a reputation for being a fast but wild driver.

In 2005 and 2006 he competed in the Grand Prix Masters formula for retired F1 drivers.

De Cesaris died on 5 October 2014 after losing control of his motorcycle on Rome's Grande Raccordo Anulare motorway.

Driving career

Pre-Formula One
A multiple karting champion, he graduated to Formula 3 in Britain, winning numerous events and finishing 2nd in the 1979 British Formula Three Championship, as runner up to Chico Serra. From Formula 3, he graduated to Formula 2 with future McLaren boss Ron Dennis' Project 4 team.

Formula One

Alfa Romeo (1980)

Related article: Alfa Romeo in Formula One

In 1980, de Cesaris was picked up by Alfa Romeo for the final events of the 1980 World Championship, replacing Vittorio Brambilla who had, in turn, replaced Patrick Depailler when he was killed during testing at Hockenheim. His first race in Canada ended after eight laps because of engine failure. In his second race, at Watkins Glen in the United States, he tangled with Derek Daly in a Tyrrell at the Junction corner and crashed into the catch fencing after two laps.

McLaren (1981)

Related article: McLaren

In 1981, largely thanks to his personal Marlboro sponsorship which also happened to be McLaren's main sponsor, de Cesaris landed a seat at McLaren which had merged with the Project Four Formula 2 team run by Ron Dennis after the 1980 season. During the season, de Cesaris proved to be fast on occasion (particularly at fast circuits), but he crashed 19 times that season either in practice or in the race, often due to driver error. The team was so worried that he would crash the car that they withdrew his car from the Dutch Grand Prix in Zandvoort after he qualified 13th. The Italian managed to finish only 6 of the 14 races he started that year. Due to the frequent crashes, he earned the nickname "Andrea de Crasheris"; team boss Ron Dennis grew so annoyed with de Cesaris's constant crashes that not only did he not extend the Italian's contract, he never actually hired an Italian driver to McLaren ever again.

In July 1981 de Cesaris and Henri Pescarolo finished second to the team of Riccardo Patrese and Michele Alboreto in a 6-hour endurance race at Watkins Glen, New York. Both teams drove Lancia cars with de Cesaris and Pescarolo finishing two laps behind.

Alfa Romeo (1982–1983)

Related article: Alfa Romeo in Formula One

After switching back to Alfa Romeo in 1982, de Cesaris became the youngest man ever to take pole position at the Long Beach Grand Prix. De Cesaris was also only the second Alfa Romeo driver to capture a pole since 1951. De Cesaris led the race but as he was passing a backmarker at a tight corner with Niki Lauda right behind him in second. De Cesaris waved his fist at the backmarker and forgot to change gear and hit the rev limiter, which allowed Lauda to take the lead and win the race; de Cesaris suffered rear brake failure and crashed hard at Pine Avenue.

In the 1982 season, de Cesaris earned a podium finish at Monte Carlo and a point in Canada. At the 1982 Monaco Grand Prix, Didier Pironi retired on the final lap due to electrical trouble with his Ferrari. De Cesaris ran out of fuel at the same time, allowing Riccardo Patrese to win his first Formula 1 race.

In 1983, with his Alfa Romeo now using a turbo engine, he took two second places, one at the 1983 German Grand Prix at Hockenheim (his first points of the season) and the other one in the season-closing 1983 South African Grand Prix at Kyalami, 9.319 seconds behind Riccardo Patrese. De Cesaris came close to winning at Spa-Francorchamps, after comfortably leading the Renault of Alain Prost for much of the race before a botched pit stop delayed him and a blown engine put him out of the race.

Ligier (1984–1985)

De Cesaris moved to Ligier in 1984, where despite the car's promising Renault turbo engine, he scored only three points during the season.

Driving a Ford BDA powered Ralt RT4 (18 of the 25 car field were RT4s), de Cesaris qualified in 5th place. After entering the pits at the end of the warm up lap, he exited the pits moments before the green flag and was almost a lap behind when the race started. He then proceeded to put in what many consider as the drive of the day to eventually finish 3rd (without ever losing a lap) behind Roberto Moreno (winner) and Keke Rosberg.

In 1985 a number of strong performances, including a fourth place at Monaco, showed early promise but the season turned into a dismal one after de Cesaris destroyed his Ligier JS25 in a quadruple mid-air rollover at the Austrian Grand Prix, and was fired by team boss Guy Ligier as a result. Guy Ligier stated that "I can no longer afford to employ this man", despite Marlboro paying the bulk of de Cesaris' salary. He was kept in the team until the next race at Zandvoort, after which he was replaced by Philippe Streiff.

Minardi (1986)

Related article: Minardi

In 1986 de Cesaris moved to Minardi. He was often outpaced by his teammate, fellow Italian and F1 rookie Alessandro Nannini during the season. For the first time in his career, de Cesaris went the entire season without scoring a point; he retired from every race but two (DNQ in Monaco, 8th in Mexico).

Brabham (1987)

Related article: Brabham

In 1987, de Cesaris switched to Brabham-BMW. With the Bernie Ecclestone-owned team he was able to achieve better results, even though he mostly failed to match his teammate Riccardo Patrese. He did not finish (DNF) 14 of 16 races. At the 1987 Belgian Grand Prix at Spa, Belgium, de Cesaris placed third behind Alain Prost and Stefan Johansson, his first points in nearly two years and his first podium finish since the final round of the 1983 season in South Africa. He would not finish another race that season.

Rial (1988)

Related article: Rial

For 1988, Brabham pulled out of Formula One and de Cesaris switched to the new Rial team, run by German Günter Schmid, the former boss of the ATS outfit. With a Cosworth engine in the car, de Cesaris managed to qualify for all sixteen races of the season and take fourth place in the Detroit Grand Prix. He also twice ran out of fuel in the last laps while running in the points, in Canada and Australia.

Dallara (1989–1990)
Related articles: Dallara, BMS Scuderia Italia

For 1989, de Cesaris moved to the Marlboro-sponsored Scuderia Italia squad. Early results were again promising. By now one of the more experienced drivers in the field, de Cesaris was on course for a podium position in Monte Carlo, before being taken out by triple world champion Nelson Piquet at the Loews Hairpin. De Cesaris lost his temper after the accident and berated Piquet's Lotus team upon returning to the pits. Two races later, after an early delay, he was being lapped by Dallara teammate Alex Caffi when he ran his fellow Italian into the wall, robbing his team of a potential podium. De Cesaris finished third at the next race in Canada, behind Williams drivers Thierry Boutsen and Riccardo Patrese in a rain-soaked race. The race would be the last time de Cesaris stood on the Formula One podium.

With a number of teams using either Ford or Judd customer V8s (Dallara used the Ford DFR) in 1990, the midfield had become more competitive. De Cesaris was involved in a number of incidents during that season, including crashing out at the start of the first lap at Interlagos and at Imola. He also nearly took out the Ferrari of 2nd-placed Nigel Mansell while being lapped during the race, prompting BBC commentator and  World Champion James Hunt to call him an idiot on live television. Reliability was a problem for Dallara, and de Cesaris again failed to score a point all season.

Jordan (1991)

Related article: Jordan Grand Prix

Dumped for JJ Lehto at Dallara at the end of 1990, de Cesaris was signed by Eddie Jordan for his team's first season in Formula One. Jordan had already run de Cesaris in Formula 3.

At the season's first race in Phoenix, de Cesaris selected the wrong gear in the short pre-qualifying session, buzzed the engine and was out. De Cesaris showed better form at Monaco, forcing his way past the Benetton of Roberto Moreno and was running in the points until the Jordan's throttle cable snapped.

In the next race in Canada he finished fourth. De Cesaris then repeated the result next time out in Mexico. The following race in France he finished sixth. Suspension failure in Great Britain led him to crash but the Italian bounced back to qualify seventh and finish fifth in Germany.

De Cesaris did not score again until the 1991 Belgian Grand Prix at Spa-Franchorchamps. Despite the pressure of being outqualified by debutant teammate Michael Schumacher, de Cesaris moved through the field to take second position until his car's Ford HB V8 blew. A communication problem between Ford and the Jordan team meant the oil tank in the car was too small to service a new type of piston ring, which used more lubricant.

De Cesaris finished the season 9th in the standings, his best result since 1983.

Tyrrell (1992–1993)
Related article: Tyrrell Racing

Despite Eddie Jordan's desire to keep de Cesaris for the 1992 season, financial realities meant it was not possible. Jordan had built up significant debts in his debut season but was able to secure sponsorship from Barclay Cigarettes. However, the brand was in direct conflict with de Cesaris' Marlboro backing.

Ken Tyrrell hired de Cesaris for his team for the 1992 season. De Cesaris took a fifth in the second race of the season in Mexico, despite being caught up in an early spin.

De Cesaris was able to score points three more times during the season, with his best result being a fourth place in the Japanese Grand Prix.

For the 1993 season, the Ilmor engine had been replaced with a Yamaha V10, which changed the dynamics and reliability of the car. The Tyrrell 020 was also replaced mid-season by the Tyrrell 021 due to age. This car, featuring active suspension, was not a success. For the third time in his career, de Cesaris failed to score a point and left Tyrrell at the end of the season.

Jordan and Sauber (1994)

Related articles: Jordan Grand Prix, Sauber

In 1994, for the first time since 1980, de Cesaris started the season without a Formula One drive. But during the Brazilian Grand Prix, Eddie Irvine was blamed for causing a massive accident which saw Jos Verstappen barrel roll over the top of Martin Brundle. On appeal, Irvine was banned for three races. At the Pacific Grand Prix, Aguri Suzuki drove Irvine's vacated Jordan. But for the next race, the San Marino Grand Prix, Eddie Jordan brought de Cesaris back to the team.

The return didn't start well after de Cesaris damaged a chassis during testing. He crashed again during the San Marino Grand Prix at Imola due to poor fitness, having not driven a race distance in six months. He bounced back in Monte Carlo, where de Cesaris stayed away from trouble and away from the barriers to take fourth place. Irvine returned for the next race but Sauber had noticed the Italian's form, and signed him to replace the injured Karl Wendlinger in the Mercedes-powered machines.

De Cesaris' first race for Sauber was his 200th Grand Prix, in Canada. Although there he retired after 24 laps, he finished in the points at the next event, the French Grand Prix at Magny-Cours.

De Cesaris' career ended when he retired with throttle problems at the 1994 European Grand Prix. JJ Lehto replaced him for the final two Grands Prix. De Cesaris ended his career with 208 Grand Prix starts, second only to Riccardo Patrese at the time. Numerous other drivers have since surpassed his total.

Legacy

De Cesaris participated in a total of 214 grands prix. He achieved 5 podiums, one pole position, and scored a total of 59 championship points. He remains to be the driver with the most Grand Prix starts (208) to his name without a win. He also holds the records for the most consecutive non-finishes, 18 from 1985 and 1986 (although many of these were mechanical failures), as well as the most successive non-finishes in a single season, 12 in 1987. Similarly, no driver has had more than his 14 DNFs in a 16-race season.  He scored points for 9 out of 10 teams he raced for: McLaren, Alfa Romeo, Brabham, Rial, Tyrrell, Jordan, Ligier, Scuderia Italia and Sauber, failing to do so only for Minardi.

Retirement

After retiring from motor racing, de Cesaris became a successful currency broker in Monte Carlo. It has been reported that he spent six months of the year in this occupation and the remainder windsurfing in Hawaii, Mexico, and around the world.  In the aftermath of the 2004 Indian Ocean earthquake and tsunami, de Cesaris gave a substantial donation to a sail manufacturer (Ezzy Sails) whose factory in Sri Lanka had been destroyed in the disaster.

Helmet
De Cesaris' helmet was white with three diagonal lines resembling the Italian flag running across the top, and a red line between two green lines in the chin area.

Racing revival

Long absent from the Formula One paddock, de Cesaris appeared at the 2005 Monaco Grand Prix, and was welcomed back with a warm hug from former Brabham team boss and Formula One boss Bernie Ecclestone. A few months later it was announced de Cesaris would race in the new Grand Prix Masters series for retired Formula One drivers. In October, he set the fastest time in the first Grand Prix Masters test at the Silverstone South circuit in England. Autosport magazine Grand Prix editor Mark Hughes predicted that de Cesaris would be one of the strongest drivers in the Masters field. In the first race at the Kyalami circuit in South Africa, de Cesaris qualified well and raced to fourth, after a fierce battle with Briton Derek Warwick.

Death
De Cesaris was killed in a road accident on 5 October 2014 at age 55 while riding his Suzuki motorbike. Italian press reported that he died on impact with the guard rail on the outer lane of Rome's Grande Raccordo Anulare freeway, in proximity of the Bufalotta turn-off.

Racing record

Career summary

Complete Formula One results
(key) (Races in bold indicate pole position; races in italics indicate fastest lap.)

 Driver did not finish the Grand Prix, but was classified as he completed over 90% of the race distance.

Complete Grand Prix Masters results
(key) Races in bold indicate pole position, races in italics indicate fastest lap.

References

1959 births
2014 deaths
Alfa Romeo Formula One drivers
Brabham Formula One drivers
British Formula Three Championship drivers
FIA European Formula 3 Championship drivers
European Formula Two Championship drivers
Grand Prix Masters drivers
Italian Formula One drivers
Italian racing drivers
Jordan Formula One drivers
Ligier Formula One drivers
McLaren Formula One drivers
Minardi Formula One drivers
Motorcycle road incident deaths
Rial Formula One drivers
Racing drivers from Rome
Sauber Formula One drivers
Scuderia Italia Formula One drivers
Tyrrell Formula One drivers
World Sportscar Championship drivers
Road incident deaths in Italy
Karting World Championship drivers